Randall Scott Miller (born March 18, 1955) is a former Major League Baseball pitcher who played with the Baltimore Orioles in  and the Montreal Expos in . He was traded along with Rudy May and Bryn Smith from the Orioles to the Expos for Don Stanhouse, Joe Kerrigan and Gary Roenicke at the Winter Meetings on December 7, 1977.

References

External links
, or Retrosheet

1955 births
Living people
American expatriate baseball players in Canada
Baltimore Orioles players
Baseball players from California
Cardenales de Lara players
American expatriate baseball players in Venezuela
Charlotte O's players
Denver Bears players
Lodi Orioles players
Major League Baseball pitchers
Miami Orioles players
Montreal Expos players
Sportspeople from Oxnard, California
Rochester Red Wings players
Sportspeople from Ventura County, California
Tigres de Aragua players
UC San Diego Tritons baseball players
University of California, San Diego alumni